The Moore Family Farm is a farm in Hawkins County, Tennessee, that is listed on the National Register of Historic Places as a historic district.

The Moore family settled on the property in about 1834 and still maintained it as a working farm as of 2006, when it was listed on the National Register. The listing included 29 contributing properties.

Buildings on the property are described as representative of "vernacular building traditions in the region".

References

Farms on the National Register of Historic Places in Tennessee
Buildings and structures in Hawkins County, Tennessee
Vernacular architecture in Tennessee
Historic districts on the National Register of Historic Places in Tennessee
National Register of Historic Places in Hawkins County, Tennessee